The 18th SS Volunteer Panzer Grenadier Division "Horst Wessel" ( was formed in 1944 around a cadre from the 1st SS Infantry Brigade and included mainly ethnic Germans (Volksdeutsche) from Hungary. The 1st battalion of about 1000 men was attached to SS Division Horst Wessel and sent to Galicia.

It was used for "rear-security" duties until it was sent to the Eastern front, with the exception of one regiment that fought the Slovak National Uprising in August 1944. It later fought as a single unit in Hungary and in Czechoslovakia where it was destroyed.

The Division was named after SA member Horst Wessel, known for being the author of the lyrics to the Nazi Party anthem, the Horst-Wessel-Lied, and glorified by the Nazi regime as a martyr of the party's early years.

Commanders
Brigadeführer Wilhelm Trabandt (25 January 1944 – 3 January 1945)
Gruppenführer Josef Fitzthum (3 January 1945 – 10 January 1945)
Standartenführer Georg Bochmann (10 January 1945 –  March 1945)
Standartenführer Heinrich Petersen (March 1945 – 8 May 1945)

Battles
Hungary (January 1944 – July 1944)
Eastern front, central sector (July 1944 – October 1944)
Poland & Czechoslovakia (October 1944 – May 1945)

See also
 List of Waffen-SS units

References

Notes

Bibliography

18
Military units and formations established in 1944
Panzergrenadier divisions of the Waffen-SS
Horst Wessel
Military units and formations disestablished in 1945